The AWA Japan Women's Championship was a women's professional wrestling championship in the AWA Superstars of Wrestling promotion. It was spun off from the AWA Superstars of Wrestling version of the AWA World Women's Championship. The inaugural champion was Sherri Martel.

AWA Superstars of Wrestling's version of the AWA World Women's Championship was created in 1999, claiming the lineage of the original World Women's Championship of the American Wrestling Association (AWA). However, in 2007 World Wrestling Entertainment (WWE) sued AWA Superstars of Wrestling promoter Dale Gagner over his use of the AWA name, which WWE owned. After the lawsuit, AWA Superstars of Wrestling ignored the reigns of the original AWA and only women's champions from 1999 onward were recognized. 

In 2007, the title was renamed to the AWA Japan Women's Championship, following the inaugural champion Sherri Martel's death on June 15. AWA Superstars of Wrestling, wanting to still recognize the current champion, recognized then-world champion Nanae Takahashi of Pro Wrestling Zero1 and Pro-Wrestling Sun as the first AWA Japan Women's Champion. The championship was retired and replaced by Hawai'i Championship Wrestling's World Women's Championship on December 16, 2007.

Title history

See also
AWA World Women's Championship
HCW World Women's Championship
Pro Wrestling Zero1

References

Pro Wrestling Zero1 championships
Women's professional wrestling championships
World professional wrestling championships
National professional wrestling championships